Jan Apell (born 4 November 1969) is a former tennis player from Sweden, who in 1994 won the ATP Tour World Championship in doubles and Davis Cup. The left-hander has retired from tennis unbeaten in Davis Cup after five matches, and played most of his career with Jonas Björkman.
He also has a Son call Emil Apell and a Daughter named Elin Apell.

ATP career finals

Singles: 1 (1 runner-up)

Doubles: 15 (9 titles, 6 runners-up)

ATP Challenger and ITF Futures finals

Singles: 7 (3–4)

Doubles: 13 (7–6)

Performance timelines

Singles

Doubles

See also
List of Sweden Davis Cup team representatives

References

External links
 
 
 

1969 births
Living people
Swedish male tennis players
Sportspeople from Gothenburg
20th-century Swedish people